Anna Sophie Charlotte of Brandenburg-Schwedt (24 December 1706 – 3 January 1751), was a German noblewoman and member of the House of Hohenzollern and by marriage Duchess of Saxe-Eisenach.

Born in Berlin, she was the third of seven children born from the marriage of Margrave Albert Frederick of Brandenburg-Schwedt (a younger brother of King Frederick I of Prussia) and Maria Dorothea Kettler, by birth Princess of Courland and Semigallia. From Anna Sophie's six older and younger siblings, only four survive adulthood: three brothers (Charles Frederick Albert, Frederick and Frederick William; all died unmarried and without legitimate issue) and one sister (Sophie Fredericka Albertine, by marriage Princess of Anhalt-Bernburg).

Life
In Berlin on 3 June 1723 Anna Sophie married Wilhelm Heinrich, Hereditary Prince of Saxe-Eisenach as his second wife. They had no children.

She became in Duchess consort of Saxe-Eisenach after the accession of her husband on 14 January 1729.

Anna Sophie died in Sangerhausen aged 44, having survived her husband by nine years. She was buried in Halle.

Notes

|-
 

 

1706 births
1751 deaths
House of Wettin
People from Berlin
Duchesses of Saxe-Eisenach